The 2017 South Africa Sevens was the second tournament within the 2017–18 World Rugby Sevens Series and the nineteenth edition of the South Africa Sevens. It was held over the weekend of 9–10 December 2017 at Cape Town Stadium in Cape Town, South Africa.

Format
The teams were drawn into four pools of four teams each. Each team played every other team in their pool once. The top two teams from each pool advanced to the Cup brackets where teams competed for the Gold, Silver, and Bronze medals. The bottom two teams from each group went to the playoffs in the Challenge Trophy brackets.

Teams
Fifteen core teams are participating in the tournament along with one invited team, the winner of the 2017 Africa Cup Sevens, Uganda:

Pool stage
All times in South African Standard Time (UTC+2:00)

Pool A

Pool B

Pool C

Pool D

Knockout stage

13th place

Challenge Trophy

5th place

Cup

Tournament placings

Source: World Rugby

Players

Scoring leaders

Source: World Rugby

Dream Team
The following seven players were selected to the tournament Dream Team at the conclusion of the tournament:

References

External links
Tournament Page

2017
2017–18 World Rugby Sevens Series
2017 in South African rugby union
December 2017 sports events in Africa